Schmerbach is a river in Bavaria, Germany. It is the right headstream of the Rauhe Ebrach.

See also
List of rivers of Bavaria

References

Rivers of Bavaria
Rivers of Germany